Vehicle registration plates are issued by the Driver Vehicle License Authority, the body responsible for vehicle registration in Ghana. The plates indicate the region where the vehicles bearing them were registered. Ghana has no restrictions on the use of number plates in the various regions, for example, a vehicle registered in the Ashanti Region can be used in the Brong-Ahafo Region.

A vehicle can be re-registered or a new license plate acquired under the following conditions:
 Vehicle bears a government registration plate and is being transferred to a civilian.
 Vehicle bears a diplomatic plate and is being transferred to a non-diplomat.
 Vehicle has a personalized plate and is being transferred to a new owner.

Format
The current Ghanaian number plate format has been in use since January 2009. Ghanaian vehicle license plates consist of a two-letter region code, followed by a four-digit numeric and a two-digit year code. The two-letter region code indicates the region in which the vehicle was registered; the four-digit numeric code is the unique item one can find on a Ghanaian number plate—the digits show the number of vehicles registered in the region in which the vehicle was registered. The year code also tells one the exact year in which the vehicle was registered. For instance, the 2567th vehicle registered in the Ashanti Region in the year 2012, will bear the number plate AS 2567-12.

The four-digit numeric code is unique, to distinguish between vehicles registered in the same region and year. The numbering starts from 1 and increases to 9999. For example, the first vehicle registered in the Central Region in the year 2009 will bear the number plate CR 1 -09 and the last vehicle in that year will bear the number plate CR 9999 -09.

The two-letter region code is the combination of the first letter from the name of the region, and the letter 'R' which denotes region; however, four of the ten regions in Ghana: Ashanti, Brong-Ahafo, Upper East and Upper West do not have the letter 'R' as part of their region code.

Below are the codes for the various regions in Ghana

AS, AE, AW  = Ashanti Region *

BA = Brong-Ahafo Region*

CR = Central Region

ER = Eastern Region

GR, GC, GE, GL, GM, GN, GT, GS, GW, GY, GX = Greater Accra Region

NR = Northern Region

UE = Upper East Region*

UW = Upper West Region*

VR = Volta Region

WR = Western Region

NB Regions with asterisks are those that do not have the letter R as part of their region code.

Starting in 2020, additional abbreviations will be added.

"The Ghana Armed Forces, Ghana Police, Fire Service and the Ghana Prisons Service have special codes on their number plates - GA, GP, FS and PS, respectively. For example, GP 5 would be a number plate for the Ghana Police.

Supplementary Plates

In the Ashanti and Greater Accra Regions, many vehicles are registered every year so, the Driver Vehicle License Authority (DVLA, the body responsible for vehicle registration in Ghana) provides supplementary plates for these two regions - AW and AE are the supplementary for Ashanti Region; GT, GN, GS, GC, GW, GE, GX, GL, GM, GY are the supplementary for the Greater Accra Region

FZB is issued as a special identification by Ghana Free zone board.

Types of Vehicle Registration Plates 

There are several types of vehicle registration plates in Ghana: black print on a white background (for private vehicles), black print on a yellow background (for commercial vehicles), green print on a white background (for agricultural equipment such as tractor) white print on a red background (for diplomats), and white print on a blue background (for motorcycles only).

Vehicles with Special Mark

The DVLA refers to vehicles with personalised or customised plates as Vehicles with Special Mark. It costs GH¢7822.79 ($1333) to get his or her preferred phrase, text or name on his or her vehicle's plate.

Government Plates
The current number plate for government vehicles has been in use since January 6, 2014 when a vehicle re-registration exercise for government vehicles was started by the Ministry of Road and Transport. A statement signed by the Transport Minister Dziva Aku Attivor reads "This is to ensure a judicious application of Government expenditure specifically on the utilization of government vehicles in Ghana as part of Government desire to prudently manage public resources."

Gallery

References

External links
 Ghana's license plates Detailed information and pictures

Ghanaian
Transport in Ghana